Arthur Bethell (born 18 December 1940) is a Barbadian cricketer. He played sixteen first-class matches for Barbados between 1963 and 1970.

References

External links
 

1940 births
Living people
Barbadian cricketers
Barbados cricketers
People from Saint John, Barbados